Maschinengewehr is German for "machine gun" (literally, "machine rifle"). The standard naming system for German machine guns was a prefix of "Maschinengewehr" (abbreviated as MG) and a two-number suffix giving the year in which the gun was designed.

Examples

Maschinengewehr 99
Maschinengewehr 01
Maschinengewehr 08
Maschinengewehr 13
Maschinengewehr 15
Maschinengewehr 30
Maschinengewehr 34
Maschinengewehr 42
Maschinengewehr 45
Maschinengewehr 60
Maschinengewehr 3
Maschinengewehr 50
Maschinengewehr 51
Maschinengewehr 710-3